The Latouche-Tréville was a wooden-hulled steam sloop aviso of the French Navy, a sistership to the D'Estaing. They were designed by Louis Dutard for both service on foreign stations and for various duties in home waters (including fishery protection).

Career 
After her commissioning, Latouche-Tréville sailed to Tahiti, where she was assigned to the French naval station of the Pacific Ocean. She returned to Brest on the 27 January 1868 to be decommissioned on 23 February 1867.

She was recommissioned on the 4 October 1868. On 18 February 1869, she collided with the packet ship Prince Pierre-Bonaparte, which sank off the Hyères Islands with the loss of sixteen lives. Latouche-Tréville rescued around 30 people. At the time of the collision, she was returning the body of Fuad Pasha to Constantinople, Ottoman Empire. She served off Terre-Neuve until 15 October 1870, when she was again decommissioned.

On 15 April 1873, she began her third commission for service in the South Atlantic. In September 1881, she took part in operations off Tunisia.

Fate 
Latouche-Tréville was struck on 5 June 1886.

References 

 Dictionnaire des bâtiments de la flotte de guerre française de Colbert à nos jours, Tome II, 1870–2006, LV Jean-Michel Roche, Imp. Rezotel-Maury Millau, 2005.
 French Warships in the Age of Sail 1786-1861: Design, Construction, Careers and Fates. Rif Winfield & Stephen Roberts. Seaforth Publishing, 2015. .

Ships built in France
1860 ships